Dürre Holzminde is a small river of Lower Saxony, Germany. It flows into the Holzminde in Holzminden.

See also
List of rivers of Lower Saxony

Rivers of Lower Saxony
Solling
Rivers of Germany